Northwest Missouri Regional Airport  is a city-owned public use airport located two nautical miles (3.7 km) west of the central business district of Maryville, a city in Nodaway County, Missouri, United States. The airport is used for general aviation with no commercial airlines.

Although most U.S. airports use the same three-letter location identifier for the FAA and IATA, this airport is assigned EVU by the FAA but has no designation from the IATA.

History 
The airport was formerly Maryville Memorial Airport and was built following World War II.  It was renamed in 2003.  It has been operated by the Rankin family for several decades.  The family also operates the Rankin Airport in the 102 River bottoms on the east side of Maryville.

Facilities and aircraft 
It has one runway designated 14/32 with a concrete surface measuring 4,600 by 75 foot (1,402 x 23 m). The main runway was extended by 600 feet in 2008. The airport's former second runway is now closed; it had been designated 18/36 and had a 2,002 x 45 ft (610 x 14 m) asphalt surface.

A terminal building was completed in 2007, providing weather information and pilots lounge. The airport was also scheduled to install new lighting and a jet fuel pump in 2009.

For the 12-month period ending September 17, 2007, the airport had 4,550 aircraft operations, an average of 12 per day: 93% general aviation and 7% air taxi. At that time there were 19 aircraft based at this airport: 89% single-engine and 11% multi-engine.

References

External links 
  Northwest Missouri Regional Airport at City of Maryville website
 
 

Airports in Missouri
Buildings and structures in Nodaway County, Missouri